, an abbreviation for "decoration truck", are a style of decorated trucks in Japan. Commonly featuring neon, LED or ultraviolet lights, detailed paintjobs and murals, and stainless steel or golden parts (both on the exterior and the interior), dekotora may be created by workers out of their work trucks for fun, or they may be designed by hobbyists for special events.

History 

In 1975, Toei released the first in a series of 10 movies called Torakku Yarō (Truck Guys). These films featured truckers who drove garishly decorated trucks around Japan. This movie was a hit with both old and young, and the dekotora fad swept the country. While dekotora were present throughout the 1970s, they were restricted to north-eastern fishing transport trucks prior to the movies. In those days, ready-made parts for trucks were not easily available, so these trucks took parts from sightseeing buses or American military vehicles.

Modern times 

Since the late 1990s, dekotora have been heavily influenced by the art of Gundam. Other decorations are more akin to modern art and retro designs that closely resemble those found in the movie.

Styles 

 Kansai-style
 Kantō-style
 Retro-style

See also 
Dekochari, bicycles modelled after dekotora
Itasha, cars decorated with anime characters
Jeepneys, trucks originally made from surplus American jeeps from WWII, and later being replaced by installing surplus parts from Japan aftermarket. 
Chiva buses, colourful buses primarily seen in Colombia and Ecuador
Tap taps, painted Haitian "buses"
Truck art in South Asia

External links
 Camion: From Geibunsha official website.

References 

Trucking subculture
Art vehicles
Japanese subcultures
Vehicles of Japan
Public art in Japan